Their Honeymoon is a 1916 American silent comedy film starring Oliver Hardy.

Cast
 Oliver Hardy - Plump (as Babe Hardy)
 Billy Ruge - Runt
 Edna Reynolds - Mother-in-law
 Ray Godfrey - Mrs. Plump
 Frank Hanson - A Tramp

See also
 List of American films of 1916
 Oliver Hardy filmography

External links

1916 films
American silent short films
American black-and-white films
1916 comedy films
1916 short films
Silent American comedy films
American comedy short films
1910s American films